The 1911 Holy Cross football team was an American football team that represented the College of the Holy Cross in the 1911 college football season.

In its fifth year under head coach Timothy F. Larkin, the team compiled a 4–5 record. William Joy was the team captain.

Though both Holy Cross and Dartmouth record their 1911 meeting in Hanover as a 6–0 win for the home team, officials on the field ruled it a 1–0 forfeit, as the Holy Cross team left the stadium after three quarters of play, reportedly to catch a train. Dartmouth 6, Holy Cross 0, was the score at the time of the forfeit.

The season-ending home game against crosstown rival Worcester Polytechnic Institute was postponed a week because of flooding on Holy Cross' home field. When the game was finally played November 25, about 4,000 people attended.

Holy Cross played its home games at Fitton Field on the college campus in Worcester, Massachusetts.

Schedule

References

Holy Cross
Holy Cross Crusaders football seasons
Holy Cross football